Willi Manages the Whole Thing is a 1972 German sports comedy film directed by Werner Jacobs and starring Heinz Erhardt, Erika von Thellmann and Hannelore Elsner. Willi takes over as manager of a provincial football team. German footballer Uwe Seeler appears as himself. It was the final entry into a four film series with Heinz Erhardt as Willi.

It was shot at the Bavaria Studios in Munich with location shooting taking place in West Berlin.

Cast
 Heinz Erhardt as Willi Kuckuck
 Erika von Thellmann as Tante Elvira
 Hannelore Elsner as Constanze
 Ernst H. Hilbich as Schnecke
 Barbara Schöne as Betty
 Gernot Endemann as Julius Appel
 Claudia Butenuth as Agnes
 Stefan Behrens as Mickey
 Loni Heuser as Cosima Schulze
 Balduin Baas as Wolfgang Amadeus Wirsing
 Gesine Hess as Reinhilde
 Reiner Brönneke as Turnegger
 Hans Terofal as Stefan Wimblinger
 Reinhold Brandes as Max Hauer
 Henning Schlüter as Butenbrink
 Uwe Seeler as himself

References

External links

1972 films
1970s sports comedy films
German sports comedy films
West German films
1970s German-language films
Films directed by Werner Jacobs
German association football films
Constantin Film films
Films shot at Bavaria Studios
1972 comedy films
1970s German films